The 9K720 Iskander (NATO reporting name SS-26 Stone) is a  mobile short-range ballistic missile system produced and deployed by the Russian military. They travel at a terminal hypersonic speed of 2100–2600 m/s (Mach 6–7) and can reach an altitude of 50 km as they range up to 500 km. The missile systems were intended to replace the obsolete OTR-21 Tochka systems by 2020 in the Russian military; however, Tochka usage has been observed in Ukraine in 2022, despite denials to the contrary from the Russian government.

The Iskander has several different conventional warheads, including a cluster munitions warhead, a fuel–air explosive enhanced-blast warhead, a high-explosive fragmentation warhead, an earth penetrator for bunker busting and an electromagnetic pulse device for anti-radar missions. The missile can also carry nuclear warheads. In September 2017, the KB Mashinostroyeniya (KBM) general designer Valery M. Kashin said that there were at least seven types of missiles (and "perhaps more") for Iskander, including one cruise missile.

History
The road-mobile Iskander was the second attempt by Russia to replace the Scud missile. The first attempt, the OTR-23 Oka, was eliminated under the INF Treaty. The design work on Iskander was begun in December 1988, initially directed by the KBM rocket weaponry designer Sergey Nepobedimy, and was not significantly affected by the dissolution of the USSR in 1991.

The first successful launch occurred in 1996.

In September 2004, at a meeting with senior defense officials reporting to President Vladimir Putin on the drafting of a defense budget for 2005, the Russian Defence Minister Sergei Ivanov spoke about the completion of static tests of a new tactical missile system called the Iskander. He said that the system would go into quantity production in 2005 and toward the end of that year, Russia would have a brigade armed with it. In March 2005, a source in the Russian defence industry told Interfax-AVN the development of new missiles with a range of 500–600 km, based on existing Iskander-E tactical missile systems, was a possibility. He said, however, that it "may take up to five or six years".

In 2006, serial production of the Iskander-M tactical ballistic missile system was launched, and the system was adopted by the Russian army. The production cost of the missile system was reported in 2014 to have been slashed by a third by cutting the 20% markup applied by the missile manufacturer at each stage of the components supply chain from a cumulative 810% to markup of 21% applied only to the finished product.

There was a report by GosNIIP, the design bureau that builds guidance for cruise missiles, that Russia completed state acceptance trials of the "ground-based 9M728/9M729 missiles and their modernized version."

In November 2016, the Russian military announced that the modernization of the Iskander-M system was underway. A number of countries were reported to have shown interest in purchasing the export version of Iskander, but such possibility was only announced in early February 2017.

The United States has argued that the 9M728/9M729 (SSC-X-7/SSC-X-8) cruise missiles used by Iskander-K violates the INF Treaty because their estimated range is beyond 500 km.

Design

The Iskander ballistic missile is superior to its predecessor, the Oka. The Iskander-M system is equipped with two solid-propellant single-stage guided missiles, model 9M723K1. Each one is controlled throughout the entire flight path and fitted with an inseparable warhead. Each missile in the launch carrier vehicle can be independently targeted in a matter of seconds. The mobility of the Iskander launch platform makes a launch difficult to prevent.

Targets can be located not only by satellite and aircraft but also by a conventional intelligence center, by an artillery observer, or from aerial photos scanned into a computer. The missiles can be re-targeted during flight in the case of engaging mobile targets. Another unique feature of Iskander-M  is the optically guided warhead, which can also be controlled by encrypted radio transmission, including such as those from AWACS or UAV. The electro-optical guidance system provides a self-homing capability. The missile's on-board computer receives images of the target, then locks onto the target with its sight and descends towards it at supersonic speed.

Boost phase thrust vector control (TVC) is accomplished by graphite vanes similar in layout to the V-2 and Scud series tactical ballistic missiles. According to some rumors, in flight, the missile follows a quasi-ballistic path, performing evasive maneuvers in the terminal phase of flight and releasing decoys in order to penetrate missile defense systems (American officials have confirmed the use of decoys in at least some versions). The missile never leaves the atmosphere as it follows a relatively flat trajectory. The missile is controlled during the whole flight with gas-dynamic and aerodynamic control surfaces. It uses small fins to reduce its radar signature.

The Russian Iskander-M travels at a hypersonic speed of 2100–2600 m/s (Mach 6–7) and an altitude of 50 km.  The Iskander-M weighs 4,615 kg, carries a warhead of 710–800 kg, has a range of 500 km and achieves a circular error probable (CEP) of 5–7 meters (when coupled with optical homing head; 30–70 m in autonomous application).

Iskander is a tactical missile system designed to be used in theater level conflicts. It is intended to use conventional or thermonuclear weapon warheads for the engagement of small and area targets (both moving and stationary), such as hostile fire weapons, air and anti-missile defenses, command posts and communications nodes and troops in concentration areas, among others. According to Russian claims, the area of destruction from a single warhead is 25,000 square meters, or about two football fields and the accuracy of the missile allows it to hit targets the size of a small window from a range of several tens of kilometers.

In 2007, a new missile for the system (and launcher) was test fired, the  cruise missile, with a range of applications up to 2000 km or more. Presently, "Iskander-M" system, outfitted with cruise and ballistic missiles, is being delivered to the military. In 2013, army missile brigades first received missiles equipped with a new control system. As of 2018, the Iskander missile complex can now strike static sea targets.

In 2020 it was said that the MAZ was the primary supplier for the chassis of the launchers for the Iskander-M because the domestic Russian products are of comparatively low quality.

The system can be transported by various vehicles, including airplanes.

Operational history

Russia

The first documented use of the Iskander was in the Russo-Georgian War in which Dutch journalist Stan Storimans was killed on 12 August 2008 in Gori. An investigation by the Dutch government revealed that a single, 5 mm fragment from an anti-personnel sub-munition, carried by an Iskander missile, killed the Dutch journalist.

In September 2009, the Russian military announced plans to deploy Iskander missiles in all the military districts of Russia "in a short time".

In June 2013, it was revealed that Russia had deployed several Iskander-M ballistic missile systems in Armenia at undisclosed locations. In 2016, it was reported by media that Armenia had received a divizion of Iskander missiles.

In November 2014, US General Breedlove stated that Russian forces "capable of being nuclear" had been moved into Crimea, the Ukrainian peninsula which the Russian Federation had annexed in March, and the following month Ukrainian Armed Forces announced that Russia had deployed a nuclear-capable Iskander division in the territory. Russian Foreign Ministry officials declared the right to deploy nuclear weapons in the peninsula, which is generally recognized as part of Ukraine, in December 2014 and June 2015.

In March 2016, at least one Iskander system was reportedly deployed at Russia's Hmeimim airbase in Syria. In January 2017 an Israeli company claimed satellite photography confirmed the Syrian deployment.

According to a Fox News report in early February 2017, four Iskander missiles had been fired at opposition targets in the Idlib province in Syria.

During the 2022 Russian invasion of Ukraine, Russia launched several Iskander missiles over their border into Ukraine as part of their assault. Here, these missiles demonstrated a previously unknown capability that employed decoys to confuse air defense systems. It is believed this technology was kept a closely guarded secret, and not included on Iskander missiles exported outside of Russia. Up from 23 April 2022, Russia deployed more units equipped with Iskander-M to the Belgorod Oblast as close as 60 km from the border of Ukraine. Ukraine said in March 2023 that it is unable to shoot down Iskander-M missiles.

Kaliningrad region
In November 2008, the Russian president Dmitry Medvedev in his first annual address to the Federal Assembly of Russia announced plans to deploy Iskander missiles to the Kaliningrad Oblast, Russia's westernmost territory on the south-eastern coast of the Baltic Sea, if the U.S. went ahead with its European Ballistic Missile Defense System. On 17 September 2009, US president Barack Obama announced the cancellation of the U.S. missile defense project in Poland and the Czech Republic. The following day, Moscow indicated it might in turn cancel the plans to deploy Iskander missiles to Kaliningrad; a few days later, the decision not to deploy was confirmed by Medvedev.

According to Russian unofficial media reports, Russia deployed Iskander missiles to the Kaliningrad Oblast as part of military exercises in March 2015.

On 8 October 2016, the Russian military confirmed that they had moved Iskander-M missiles into the Kaliningrad Oblast, adding the move was part of routine drills and had happened previously multiple times and would happen in future. A few days after, Chairman of the Defense Committee of the Russian State Duma Vladimir Shamanov commented that the transfer of missile systems Iskander-M into the Kaliningrad region had been effected to counter potential threats from the U.S. missile defense facilities that had been stationed in Europe as well as those that might be stationed subsequently.

In early February 2018, Shamanov confirmed that Russia had deployed an unidentified number of Iskander missiles to the Kaliningrad region. Days prior, the local military commanders said that the "park zones" for Iskander missiles deployment had been completed in the Kaliningrad region, as well as in North Ossetia.

Armenia
Armenia reportedly used its Iskander missiles against Azerbaijani forces during the 2020 Nagorno-Karabakh War. According to unconfirmed claims by ex-president of Armenia Serzh Sargsyan, the missiles were fired on the town of Shushi after its capture by Azerbaijani forces in the last days of the war. Responding to these claims, Prime Minister Nikol Pashinyan neither confirmed nor denied the claim that an Iskander was fired on Shushi, but implied that the missiles that were launched did not explode or only exploded "by 10 percent." The Armenian prime minister's claims were rejected by a number of Russian lawmakers and military experts as well as by ex-defense minister of Armenia Seyran Ohanyan (under whom the missiles were acquired by Armenia). The Russian Ministry of Defence released a statement claiming that the Iskander missiles were not used at all during the 2020 Nagorno-Karabakh War. Another claim was made by an anonymous Azerbaijani official that Armenian forces fired an Iskander missile at Azerbaijan's capital Baku in the last days of the 2020 Nagorno-Karabakh War, but it was shot down by an Israeli-made Barak 8. On March 15, employees of the Azerbaijan National Agency for Mine Action, who were demining and clearing the territories from mines and shells in Shushi, discovered the wreckage of an Iskander-M missile with identification number 9M723.

Variants

Iskander-M
Variant for the Russian Armed Forces with two 9M723 quasi-ballistic missiles with published range 415 km, rumoured 500 km. Speed Mach 6–7, flight altitude up to 6–50 km, nuclear capable stealth missile, controlled at all stages, not ballistic flight path. Immediately after the launch and upon approach to the target, the missile performs intensive maneuvering to evade anti-ballistic missiles. The missile constantly maneuvers during flight as well.

Iskander-K

"K" for Krylataya ("Winged"). Variant intended to carry various types of cruise missiles (literally winged rocket). At present, it includes:
 9M728 (SSC-X-7) also known as R-500 – flight altitude up to 6 km, published range up to 500 km and automatic adjustment in the way, follow of terrain relief in flight. The missile is evolved from 3M10, 3M54/3M14 and Kh-101/102 missiles and can be launched also by the Iskander-M.
According to RF, its range is only 480 km and its specially-developed self-propelled launcher can carry 4 missiles. The 9M729 missile has a higher yield warhead and a new control system for greater accuracy. Most parts and components of the 9M728 and 9M729 missiles are identical.

Currently there are 7 different types of ballistic and cruise missiles for both variants of the Iskander missile system.

Iskander-E

"E" for Eksport. The director of the state corporation Rostec Sergey Chemezov commented that the Iskander missile complex is a serious offensive weapon capable of carrying a nuclear warhead. This ballistic missile system is in the military list of products prohibited for export. Iskander missile complexes cannot be exported.

In 2016, Armenia, a Russian ally and a member of the Collective Security Treaty Organization (CSTO) became the first foreign country to operate the system. Iskander-E has a maximum range up to 280 km, to comply with Missile Technology Control Regime restrictions for export, and is fitted with a simplified inertial guidance system. It flies on a flattened trajectory under 50 km altitude, allowing aerodynamic steering using tail fins, permitting a less predictable flight path and accurate delivery.  The system can also use missiles carrying warheads with cluster munitions.

Operators

  – 160 units (13 rocket brigades with 12 units each, and one unit with 4 units at Kapustin Yar). In service with the Western Military District since 2010. Missiles are also deployed in Armenia. Two deliveries in 2013. Missile units in Krasnodar and Stavropol territories as well as in the Republic of Adygea in the 49th Army of the Southern Military District, and a missile brigade in the Eastern Military District received Iskander-M in 2013. One more delivery in July 2014. Missile brigade, stationed in the Orenburg region, rearmed on "Iskander-M" on 20 November 2014. 6th brigade delivered on 16 June 2015 to unit in Ulan Ude (presumably the 103rd Rocket Brigade). Seventh brigade delivered in November 2015 to the Southern Military District. All scheduled 120 complexes. 20th Independent Guards Rocket Brigade – 5th Red Banner Army of the Eastern Military District (the brigade stationed in Spassk-Dalniy, Primorsky Krai) – in June 2016. One more delivery in November 2016 to the Central MD. Next delivery conducted in 2nd quarter of 2017. The contract for two more brigades and cruise missiles for the system signed in August 2017 will increase the total number of rocket brigades to 13. A brigade set of Iskander-M tactical ballistic missile systems has been delivered to the personnel of a missile large unit in the Western Military District in late 2017. The last brigade was delivered to the WMD for a missile formation of the combined arms army in the Kursk Region in November 2019. One more brigade set and two battalion sets were delivered in late 2021. More missiles ordered in August 2022.
  – 25 units. Several systems were displayed at the Independence Day parade rehearsal in September 2016. Two managers of the Russian military-industrial complex Rosoboronexport confirmed that four 9K720 Iskander systems were delivered to Armenia per CSTO arms agreement, thus making Armenia, a country in military union with Russia, the first foreign state to have the missile system. In February 2017, the Defence minister of Armenia told a Russian mass media outlet that the Iskander missiles stationed in Armenia and shown at the military parade in September 2016 were owned and operated by the Armed Forces of Armenia.
  – 4 regiments (48 launchers). During the Dubai Airshow 2017 exhibition, representatives of the Federal Service of Military-Technical Cooperation officially confirmed that the Iskander-E missile system was delivered to one of the countries in the Middle East and North Africa region. French defense writer Philippe Langloit wrote in the September–October 2017 issue of DSI magazine that Algeria had received 4 Iskander-E regiments. It was confirmed by Kommersant magazine.
  – bought an undisclosed number of Iskander ballistic missile systems in May 2022, according to a statement made by Belarus President Alexander Lukashenko. President Putin has announced a plan to give Belarus nuclear capable Islander missiles. He said: "can fire ballistic and cruise missiles, both conventional and nuclear types". The systems were delivered in December 2022 and were allegedly handed over to full Belarusian autonomous control in February 2023.

Details

Specifications
 Manufacturer: Votkinsk Machine Building Plant (Votkinsk) – missilesProduction Association Barricades (Volgograd) – ground equipmentKBM (Kolomna) – developer of the system
 Launch range:
 maximum: 500 km (Iskander-M, unofficial)
 minimum: 50 km
 Accuracy:
 5–7 m with terminal phase DSMAC optoelectronic homing system (Iskander-M)
 1–30 m 9K720
 Time to launch: up to 4 min from highest readiness, up to 16 min from march
 Interval between launches: less than a minute
 Operating temperature range: −50 °C to +50 °C
 Burnout velocity: ≈2,100 m/s
 Number of missiles:
 on 9P78 launcher: 2
 on 9T250 transloader: 2
 assigned service life: 10 years
 Crew: 3 (launcher truck)

System components

The full Iskander system includes
 missiles
 transporter-erector-launcher vehicle (chassis of 8×8 MZKT-79306 ASTROLOG truck)
 Transporter and loader vehicle (chassis of 8×8 MZKT-79306 ASTROLOG truck)
 Command and staff vehicle (chassis of KAMAZ six-wheel truck)
 Information preparation station vehicle (chassis of KAMAZ six-wheel truck)
 Maintenance and repair vehicle (chassis of KAMAZ six-wheel truck)
 Life support vehicle (chassis of KAMAZ six-wheel truck)
 Depot equipment set
 set of equipment for TEL training class
 set of equipment for CSV training class
 Training posters
 Training missile mock-up

Intended targets
The system is intended to use conventional warheads for the engagement of point and area targets, including:
 hostile fire weapons (missile systems, multiple launch rocket systems, long-range artillery pieces)
 air and missile defense weapons, aerodrome
 fixed- and rotary-wing aircraft at airfields
 command posts and communications nodes
 troops in concentration areas
 critical civilian infrastructure facilities
It is also capable of striking strongly protected targets, such as bunkers or hardened aircraft shelters

See also
 R-400 Oka
 Pralay
 Zolfaghar (missile)
 Persian Gulf (missile)
 B-611
 DF-11
 Fateh-110
 MGM-52 Lance (retired in 1992)
 Pluton (retired in 1993)
 MGM-140 ATACMS
 LORA
 Hrim-2

Comparable missiles
 Kh-47M2 Kinzhal (air launched)
 Hyunmoo-2 (may be based on the Iskander)
 KN-23

Notes

References

External links

 SS-26 Stone @ Defense Update
 Infographics
 CSIS Missile Threat – SS-26 (Iskander)

Ballistic missiles of Russia
Theatre ballistic missiles
Votkinsk Machine Building Plant products
KB Mashinostroyeniya products
Modern thermobaric weapons of Russia
Nuclear missiles of Russia
Post–Cold War weapons of Russia
Military equipment introduced in the 2000s